Lift Every Voice is a studio album by American jazz pianist Andrew Hill featuring performances recorded in 1969 and released on the Blue Note label in 1970. The original album features Hill with a large choir performing five original compositions and the 2001 CD reissue added six additional compositions recorded in 1970 as bonus tracks.

Reception

The Allmusic review by Richard S. Ginell awarded the album 4 stars calling it a "remarkably advanced fusion of voices and jazz quintet".

Track listing
All compositions by Andrew Hill
 "Hey Hey" - 7:55
 "Lift Every Voice" - 8:06
 "Two Lullabies" - 5:44
 "Love Chant" - 5:42
 "Ghetto Lights" - 5:13

Bonus tracks on CD reissue:
 "Blue Spark" - 5:57
 "A Tender Tale" - 6:58
 "Drew's Tune" - 6:22
 "Mother Mercy" - 5:16
 "Natural Spirit" - 7:25
 "Such It Is" - 5:37

Recorded on May 16, 1969 (tracks 1-5), March 6, 1970 (tracks 6-8) and March 13, 1970 (tracks 9-11).

Personnel
Original LP (1-5):
Andrew Hill - piano
Woody Shaw - trumpet
Carlos Garnett - tenor saxophone
Richard Davis - bass
Freddie Waits - drums
Joan Johnson, LaReine LaMar, Gail Nelson, Antenett Goodman Ray - vocals
Lawrence Marshall - vocals, conductor

Bonus tracks, 1970 recording (6-11):
Andrew Hill - piano
Lee Morgan - trumpet
Bennie Maupin - alto flute, bass clarinet, tenor saxophone
Ron Carter - bass
Ben Riley - drums
Benjamin Franklin Carter, Milt Grayson, Hugh Harnell, Ron Steward, Lillian Williams - vocals
Lawrence Marshall - vocals, conductor

References

Blue Note Records albums
Andrew Hill albums
1970 albums
Albums recorded at Van Gelder Studio
Albums produced by Francis Wolff